This is the list of 159 isomers of undecane.

Straight Chain
Undecane

Decane

2-Methyldecane
3-Methyldecane
4-Methyldecane
5-Methyldecane

Nonane

Ethyl
3-Ethylnonane
4-Ethylnonane
5-Ethylnonane

Dimethyl

2,2-Dimethylnonane
2,3-Dimethylnonane
2,4-Dimethylnonane
2,5-Dimethylnonane
2,6-Dimethylnonane
2,7-Dimethylnonane
2,8-Dimethylnonane
3,3-Dimethylnonane
3,4-Dimethylnonane
3,5-Dimethylnonane
3,6-Dimethylnonane
3,7-Dimethylnonane
4,4-Dimethylnonane
4,5-Dimethylnonane
4,6-Dimethylnonane
5,5-Dimethylnonane

Octane

Propyl
4-Propyloctane
4-(1-Methylethyl)octane or 4-isopropyloctane

Ethyl+Methyl

3-Ethyl-2-methyloctane
3-Ethyl-3-methyloctane
3-Ethyl-4-methyloctane
3-Ethyl-5-methyloctane
3-Ethyl-6-methyloctane
4-Ethyl-2-methyloctane
4-Ethyl-3-methyloctane
4-Ethyl-4-methyloctane
4-Ethyl-5-methyloctane
5-Ethyl-2-methyloctane
5-Ethyl-3-methyloctane
6-Ethyl-2-methyloctane

Trimethyl

2,2,3-Trimethyloctane
2,2,4-Trimethyloctane
2,2,5-Trimethyloctane
2,2,6-Trimethyloctane
2,2,7-Trimethyloctane
2,3,3-Trimethyloctane
2,3,4-Trimethyloctane
2,3,5-Trimethyloctane
2,3,6-Trimethyloctane
2,3,7-Trimethyloctane
2,4,4-Trimethyloctane
2,4,5-Trimethyloctane
2,4,6-Trimethyloctane
2,4,7-Trimethyloctane
2,5,5-Trimethyloctane
2,5,6-Trimethyloctane
2,6,6-Trimethyloctane
3,3,4-Trimethyloctane
3,3,5-Trimethyloctane
3,3,6-Trimethyloctane
3,4,4-Trimethyloctane
3,4,5-Trimethyloctane
3,4,6-Trimethyloctane
3,5,5-Trimethyloctane
4,4,5-Trimethyloctane

Heptane

Diethyl
3,3-Diethylheptane
3,4-Diethylheptane
3,5-Diethylheptane
4,4-Diethylheptane

Ethyl+Methyl

3-Ethyl-2,2-dimethylheptane
3-Ethyl-2,3-dimethylheptane
3-Ethyl-2,4-dimethylheptane
3-Ethyl-2,5-dimethylheptane
3-Ethyl-2,6-dimethylheptane
3-Ethyl-3,4-dimethylheptane
3-Ethyl-3,5-dimethylheptane
3-Ethyl-4,4-dimethylheptane
3-Ethyl-4,5-dimethylheptane
4-Ethyl-2,2-dimethylheptane
4-Ethyl-2,3-dimethylheptane
4-Ethyl-2,4-dimethylheptane
4-Ethyl-2,5-dimethylheptane
4-Ethyl-2,6-dimethylheptane
4-Ethyl-3,3-dimethylheptane
4-Ethyl-3,4-dimethylheptane
4-Ethyl-3,5-dimethylheptane
5-Ethyl-2,2-dimethylheptane
5-Ethyl-2,3-dimethylheptane
5-Ethyl-2,4-dimethylheptane
5-Ethyl-2,5-dimethylheptane
5-Ethyl-3,3-dimethylheptane

Tetramethyl

2,2,3,3-Tetramethylheptane
2,2,3,4-Tetramethylheptane
2,2,3,5-Tetramethylheptane
2,2,3,6-Tetramethylheptane
2,2,4,4-Tetramethylheptane
2,2,4,5-Tetramethylheptane
2,2,4,6-Tetramethylheptane
2,2,5,5-Tetramethylheptane
2,2,5,6-Tetramethylheptane
2,2,6,6-Tetramethylheptane
2,3,3,4-Tetramethylheptane
2,3,3,5-Tetramethylheptane
2,3,3,6-Tetramethylheptane
2,3,4,4-Tetramethylheptane
2,3,4,5-Tetramethylheptane
2,3,4,6-Tetramethylheptane
2,3,5,5-Tetramethylheptane
2,3,5,6-Tetramethylheptane
2,4,4,5-Tetramethylheptane
2,4,4,6-Tetramethylheptane
2,4,5,5-Tetramethylheptane
3,3,4,4-Tetramethylheptane
3,3,4,5-Tetramethylheptane
3,3,5,5-Tetramethylheptane
3,4,4,5-Tetramethylheptane

Methyl+Propyl

2-Methyl-4-propylheptane
3-Methyl-4-propylheptane
4-Methyl-4-propylheptane
2-Methyl-3-(1-methylethyl)heptane
2-Methyl-4-(1-methylethyl)heptane
3-Methyl-4-(1-methylethyl)heptane
4-Methyl-4-(1-methylethyl)heptane

tert-Butyl
4-(1,1-Dimethylethyl)heptane or 4-tert-Butylheptane

Hexane

Pentamethyl

2,2,3,3,4-Pentamethylhexane
2,2,3,3,5-Pentamethylhexane
2,2,3,4,4-Pentamethylhexane
2,2,3,4,5-Pentamethylhexane
2,2,3,5,5-Pentamethylhexane
2,2,4,4,5-Pentamethylhexane
2,3,3,4,4-Pentamethylhexane
2,3,3,4,5-Pentamethylhexane

Ethyl+Trimethyl

3-Ethyl-2,2,3-trimethylhexane
3-Ethyl-2,2,4-trimethylhexane
3-Ethyl-2,2,5-trimethylhexane
3-Ethyl-2,3,4-trimethylhexane
3-Ethyl-2,3,5-trimethylhexane
3-Ethyl-2,4,4-trimethylhexane
3-Ethyl-2,4,5-trimethylhexane
3-Ethyl-3,4,4-trimethylhexane
4-Ethyl-2,2,3-trimethylhexane
4-Ethyl-2,2,4-trimethylhexane
4-Ethyl-2,2,5-trimethylhexane
4-Ethyl-2,3,3-trimethylhexane
4-Ethyl-2,3,4-trimethylhexane

Diethyl+Methyl

3,3-Diethyl-2-methylhexane
3,3-Diethyl-4-methylhexane
3,4-Diethyl-2-methylhexane
3,4-Diethyl-3-methylhexane
4,4-Diethyl-2-methylhexane

Dimethyl+Propyl

2,2-Dimethyl-3-(1-methylethyl)hexane
2,3-Dimethyl-3-(1-methylethyl)hexane
2,4-Dimethyl-3-(1-methylethyl)hexane
2,5-Dimethyl-3-(1-methylethyl)hexane

Pentane

Hexamethyl
2,2,3,3,4,4-Hexamethylpentane

Ethyl+Tetramethyl
3-Ethyl-2,2,3,4-tetramethylpentane
3-Ethyl-2,2,4,4-tetramethylpentane

Diethyl+Dimethyl
3,3-Diethyl-2,2-dimethylpentane
3,3-Diethyl-2,4-dimethylpentane

Trimethyl+Propyl
2,2,4-Trimethyl-3-(1-methylethyl)pentane
2,3,4-Trimethyl-3-(1-methylethyl)pentane

Lists of isomers of alkanes
Hydrocarbons
Isomerism